Sandilipay Hindu College ( Caṇṭilippāy Intuk Kallūri) is a provincial school in Sandilipay, Sri Lanka.

See also
 List of schools in Northern Province, Sri Lanka

References

Provincial schools in Sri Lanka
Schools in Jaffna District